The Girl Who Came to Supper is a musical with a book by Harry Kurnitz and music and lyrics by Noël Coward, based on Terence Rattigan's 1953 play The Sleeping Prince. The musical premiered on Broadway in 1963.

Plot
The story is set in 1911 London at the time of George V's coronation. American-born chorus girl Mary Morgan becomes involved with Balkan archduke Charles, the widowed prince regent of Carpathia, after he sees a performance of her West End musical The Coconut Girl.  She soon becomes involved with the actions of his teenaged son, King Nicholas, as well as the Queen Mother. A peripheral character, fish-and-chips peddler Ada Cockle, appears to be present solely to entertain the audience with a rousing fifteen-minute rendition of traditional Cockney tunes.

Production
Rattigan's play had been staged in London with Laurence Olivier and Vivien Leigh, on Broadway with Michael Redgrave and Barbara Bel Geddes, and filmed as The Prince and the Showgirl with Olivier and Marilyn Monroe, so its story was a fairly familiar one. The musical opened to rave reviews in Boston but was received less favorably by the critics in Toronto. During its Philadelphia run, President Kennedy was assassinated, necessitating the replacement of the opening number, "Long Live the King (If He Can)".

The musical opened on Broadway, directed and choreographed by Joe Layton, on December 8, 1963 at The Broadway Theatre, where it ran for 112 performances and four previews. The cast featured Florence Henderson as Mary, José Ferrer as Charles, Irene Browne as the Queen Mother, Sean Scully as Nicholas, British music hall star Tessie O'Shea as Ada Cockle, and Roderick Cook as Peter Northbrook.

Henderson and O'Shea were singled out for praise by the critics — Henderson for her one-woman delivery of an abridged version of The Coconut Girl, and O'Shea for her extended song-and-dance routine of Cockney tunes. Otherwise, the review by the influential critic Walter Kerr in the Herald Tribune was mostly negative. He and others felt the show was an unsuccessful attempt to duplicate the success of the earlier My Fair Lady.

O'Shea won the Tony Award for Best Featured Actress in a Musical. Nominations also went to Coward and Kurnitz for Best Author of a Musical and Irene Sharaff for Best Costume Design.

The show proved to be the last with a Coward score and the only one of his musicals never produced in London.

An original cast recording was released on the Columbia Records label. (Reissue: Sony Broadway SK 48210).

Song list

Act I
 Swing Song
 Yasni Kozkolai (Carpathian National Anthem)
 My Family Tree
 I've Been Invited to a Party
 Waltz
 I've Been Invited to a Party (Reprise)
 When Foreign Princes Come to Visit Us
 Sir or Ma'am
 Soliloquies
 Lonely
 London is a Little Bit of All Right
 What Ho, Mrs. Brisket
 Don't Take Our Charlie for the Army
 Saturday Night at the Rose and Crown
 London Is a Little Bit of All Right (Reprise)
 Here and Now
 I've Been Invited to a Party (Reprise)
 Soliloquies (Reprise)

Act II
 Coronation Chorale
 How Do You Do, Middle Age?
 Here and Now (Reprise)
 The Stingaree
 Curt, Clear and Concise
 Tango
 Welcome to Pootzie Van Doyle
 The Coconut Girl
 Paddy MacNeill and His Automobile
 Swing Song (Reprise)
 Six Lillies of the Valley
 The Walla Walla Boola
 This Time It's True Love
 I'll Remember Her

Awards and nominations

Original Broadway production

Notes

References
Not Since Carrie: Forty Years of Broadway Musical Flops by Ken Mandelbaum, published by St. Martin's Press (1991), pages 120-23

External links

Synopsis at The Guide to Musical Theatre
Synopsis and other information at Noël Coward Music.com
 Ovrtur.com Listing

1963 musicals
Broadway musicals
Plays set in London
Fiction set in 1911
Musicals by Noël Coward
Musicals based on plays